Cory Walker is an American comic book artist known for his work as a penciler on the Image Comics' series Invincible, which he co-created with writer Robert Kirkman. With Kirkman he also collaborated on several comics for Image and Marvel Comics. In 2020 he was revealed to be the lead designer of the forthcoming Invincible animated series.

Bibliography

Image Comics 

 Superpatriot: America's Fighting Force #1–4 (2002)
 Invincible #1–7, 25, 50, 66–67, 85–86, 93–96, 100, 127–132, 144 (2003–2018)
 Battle Pope #9–10 (2006)
 Science Dog #1–2, 25 (2010–11, 2020)

Marvel Comics 

 Spider-Man Unlimited (Vol. 3) #4 (2004)
 Marvel Team-Up #14, 19 (2005, 2006)
 I Heart Marvel: Web of Romance #1 (2006)
 The Irredeemable Ant-Man #7–8 (2007)
 The Punisher War Journal (Vol. 2) #13 (2007)
Destroyer MAX #1–5 (2007)

DC Comics 

Shadowpact #3, 6 (2006)

References

	

American comics artists
, Walker
Living people
1980 births